HBZ may refer to:
 Croatian Fraternal Union Avenue, in Zagreb, Croatia
 Habib Bank AG Zurich
 Heber Springs Municipal Airport, in Arkansas, United States
 Hemoglobin subunit zeta, encoded by the HBZ gene
 Hazza bin Zayed Stadium, in Al Ain, United Arab Emirates